Jabalieh or Rock Dome, also known as the Gabri Dome, is located in Kerman, Iran. Gonbad-e Jabaliyeh also goes by the names, Gonbad-e Jabaliyeh, Gonbad-e Jabalīyeh, gnbd jblyh, گنبد جبليه The dome, a place of historical importance in Iran, has been constructed of stone and brick, though the building is of stone and gypsum, and its architectural effects have been inspired from the Sassanide period. It was repaired during the first decades of the advent of Islam in Iran.

It is of octagonal design and comprises three floors crowned by a rather flat dome, totally empty inside, and is remarkable because of being constructed of stone rather than the more usual brick.

It appears to predate the 2nd millennium AD and may have been a Zoroastrian building. According to one theory, it is believed to be the resting place of a Zoroastrian priest, while as per another theory it was a fire temple.

To get there, take a shared taxi from Shohada Square. The rocky outcrops over looking the Martyrs Cemetery just south-east of the Gonbad-e Jabalieh, offer a fine outlook over Kerman, if one manages to climb to the top.

References

Buildings and structures in Kerman Province
Tourist attractions in Kerman Province
Domes
Octagonal buildings
Stone buildings
Religious buildings and structures in Iran
Sasanian architecture